The Communauté de communes Creuse Grand Sud is a communauté de communes, an intercommunal structure, in the Creuse department, in the Nouvelle-Aquitaine region, central France. It was created in January 2014 by the merger of the former communautés de communes Aubusson-Felletin and Plateau de Gentioux. Its area is 612.6 km2, and its population was 11,915 in 2018. Its seat is in Aubusson.

Communes
The communauté de communes consists of the following 26 communes:

Alleyrat
Aubusson
Blessac
Croze
Faux-la-Montagne
Felletin
Gentioux-Pigerolles
Gioux
Moutier-Rozeille
Néoux
La Nouaille
Saint-Alpinien
Saint-Amand
Saint-Avit-de-Tardes
Sainte-Feyre-la-Montagne
Saint-Frion
Saint-Maixant
Saint-Marc-à-Frongier
Saint-Marc-à-Loubaud
Saint-Pardoux-le-Neuf
Saint-Quentin-la-Chabanne
Saint-Sulpice-les-Champs
Saint-Yrieix-la-Montagne
Vallière
La Villedieu
La Villetelle

References

Creuse Grand Sud
Creuse Grand Sud